= Inchaghaun =

Island in Ireland

Native name: Inis an Ghainimh
- Location within island of Ireland

Geography
- Location: Atlantic Ocean
- Coordinates: 53°17′43″N 9°43′07″W

Administration
- Ireland
- Province: Connacht
- County: Galway

Demographics
- Population: 2 (2006)

Inchaghaun (Gaeilge: Inis an Ghainimh) is an island in County Galway, Ireland.

== Demographics ==
Historical population

| Year | Pop. | ±% |
|---|---|---|
| 1841 | 0 | — |
| 1851 | 0 | 0.00% |
| 1861 | 0 | 0.00% |
| 1871 | 7 | — |
| 1881 | 20 | +185.7% |
| 1891 | 21 | +5.0% |
| 1901 | 10 | −52.4% |
| 1911 | 7 | −30.0% |

| Year | Pop. | ±% |
|---|---|---|
| 1926 | 13 | +85.7% |
| 1936 | 10 | −23.1% |
| 1946 | 7 | −30.0% |
| 1951 | 5 | −28.6% |
| 1956 | 6 | +20.0% |
| 1961 | 8 | +33.3% |
| 1966 | 18 | +125.0% |
| 1971 | 7 | −61.1% |

| Year | Pop. | ±% |
|---|---|---|
| 1979 | 7 | +0.0% |
| 1981 | 5 | −28.6% |
| 1986 | 3 | −40.0% |
| 1991 | 1 | −66.7% |
| 1996 | 3 | +200.0% |
| 2002 | 3 | +0.0% |
| 2006 | 2 | −33.3% |

Source: Central Statistics Office. "CNA17: Population by Off Shore Island, Sex and Year". CSO.ie.
